Colin Bradley (2 March 1921 – 6 September 2013) was a former Australian rules footballer who played with Melbourne in the Victorian Football League (VFL).

Notes

External links 

1921 births
2013 deaths
Australian rules footballers from Victoria (Australia)
Melbourne Football Club players
Preston Football Club (VFA) players